The  KODAK  Motioncorder  is a 512 x 480 High-speed camera.  It is part of the Photron FASTCAM line of cameras, introduced in 1996.
Photron Kodak Motioncorder was introduce in 1996.  The camera was manufacture by Photron but trade branded as a KODAK MASD product.   The Kodak Motioncorder and the Photron FASTCAM Super 10K Motioncorder are the same camera, just different trade names.

Overview and features
The Kodak Motioncorder native resolution is 512 x 480 pixels x 8 bits at 250 FPS.  By reducing the resolution, the frame rate for recording can be increased.  As an example, 1000 FPS is achieved with a resolution of 256 x 240 pixels at 8 bits.   The 10,000 FPS requires the resolution be reduced to 128 x 34 pixels at 8 bits.  The Kodak Motioncorder came with three different memory storages capabilities.  The Processor could hold either 128 MB, 384 MB or 512 MB.  With the maximum memory, the camera can record 2,184 images or 8.73 seconds of record time at 250 FPS.  Digital image data could be read from the Processor through a SCSI interface.  Live video images could be displayed on NTSC or PAL monitors.  Ancillary information would be display as OSD (On-Screen-Data).  The camera cable could be up to 16m from the Processor.  The system could be controlled from a computer through an RS-232 interface sending simple ASCII commands.

The Kodak Motioncorder  has been used in many diverse applications such as production line troubleshooting, packaging machine design and university research.   It has been verified by the manufacture that over 4000 Motioncorders/Super 10K cameras were produced from 1996 to 2005.

Another popular High-speed camera from this era was the Redlake Motionscope.  Both products used the same CCD sensor (7.4 um pixel.  The Kodak Motioncorder could record 250 FPS while the Redlake Motionscope could record 240 fps.  These two products ushered in a new class of cameras which were low cost with relatively high speed image capture that was not previously available.

See also 
 Photron (Photron's FASTCAM High-speed Cameras)
 High-speed photography
 High-speed camera

External links
 Official website (Photron)
  (Kodak Motion Corder)
  (Rolling vs. Global Shutter)
   (Electronic Imaging)

Electronics companies of Japan
Digital movie cameras
Film and video technology
Digital cameras